Claus Lundekvam (born 22 February 1973) is a Norwegian former professional footballer who played as a centre-back.

Lundekvam began his career with Brann before moving to English side Southampton in 1996 where he played until his retirement in 2008. He made a total of 413 appearances for the club where 290 was in the Premier League. He notably played for Southampton in the 2003 FA Cup Final against Arsenal. Lundekvam was capped 40 times for Norway and often captained the national team.

Playing career
Born in Austevoll, Norway, Lundekvam joined Brann as a junior player with his senior debut coming in 1993. He eventually gained a regular place at centre-back before being sold to English side Southampton in the autumn of 1996. He was the team's first choice for captain for several years.

Lundekvam made his debut for Norway in November 1995, but did not become a regular until 2002. He was capped 40 times, scoring twice. His first international goal, against Bosnia-Herzegovina in 2002, was the 1,000th goal in the history of the Norwegian national team.

He scored only two goals during his Saints career. His first came against Wolverhampton Wanderers on 3 April 2004 in a 4–1 win, and his second against Cardiff in 2006 – coincidentally, both teams were managed at the time by former Saints manager Dave Jones.

In 2002–03, he contributed to what was undoubtedly Southampton's best season since the 1980s, when they finished eighth in the Premier League and reached the FA Cup final, where they narrowly missed out on silverware in a 1–0 loss to Arsenal. This was during the management of Gordon Strachan, who famously joked when Lundekvam was stretchered off injured in a game against Leicester City in the 2003–04 season that he "didn't have a clue" whether the player was unconscious as "that's what he's always like".

Lundekvam remained at Southampton after their relegation from the Premier League in 2005. He went off injured after five minutes of the first game of the 2006–07 season, away to Derby County on 6 August 2006 (being replaced in the centre of defence by Chris Baird) and missed the first two months of the season. He then enjoyed a long run in the team before another injury in March put him out for another month. In the game at St Mary's against Southend United on 6 May 2007, he fell awkwardly sustaining a serious ankle injury which put him out of action. On 18 March 2008, it was announced that his injury was such that his playing career was over.

Later career
Lundekvam later had problems with depression, abusing cocaine and alcohol following his retirement. About his addiction he said: "I would drink two litres of hard liquor and do between five and ten grams of cocaine every day." Lundekvam got help to overcome his addiction and issues at Sporting Chance Clinic, a recovery facility for athletes set up by former Arsenal captain Tony Adams. In July 2012, Lundekvam claimed that he, team-mates and opposing captains were involved in betting fraud during their playing days. "We could make deals with the opposing captain about, for example, betting on the first throw, the first corner, who started with the ball, a yellow card or a penalty. Those were the sorts of thing we had influence over." These allegations were later denied by Lundekvam's former team-mate and captain, Francis Benali.

Following his retirement, Lundekvam later returned to Norway with his then-wife Nina, their two children and a dog named Lucky. In 2015, he released his biography detailing his career and struggles with addiction and mental health. Lundekvam worked regularly as a pundit for TV 2, the largest commercial broadcaster in Norway, until 2016. Lundekvam now works with the Psychiatry Alliance in Bergen to help others with mental health and drug issues by sharing his own experiences.

Career statistics

Club

International

Honours
Southampton
FA Cup runner-up: 2002–03

References

External links

1973 births
Living people
People from Austevoll
Norwegian footballers
Association football defenders
SK Brann players
Southampton F.C. players
Eliteserien players
Premier League players
English Football League players
FA Cup Final players
Norway international footballers
Norwegian expatriate footballers
Expatriate footballers in England
Norwegian expatriate sportspeople in England
Sportspeople from Vestland